Ernest Buckland was a New Zealand rugby league player who represented New Zealand between 1909 and 1911.

Playing career
Buckland played for Taranaki in their first ever game of rugby league in 1908. In 1909 he first played for New Zealand, being selected as part of the squad that toured Australia.

In 1910 Buckland played in the Test match against the touring Great Britain Lions side, scoring a try. He then toured Australia the following year.

Buckland later moved to Wellington, playing for the Wellington rugby league team in 1912.

He was named in the Taranaki Rugby League's team of the century in 2008.

References

New Zealand rugby league players
New Zealand national rugby league team players
Taranaki rugby league team players
Wellington rugby league team players
Rugby league wingers
Rugby league centres
1887 births
1945 deaths